The Narara Music Festival was an outdoor music festival held on the Central Coast of New South Wales, Australia in 1983 and 1984.  Despite the name, it was actually held at Somersby, a short distance from Narara. Narara is the original clan name of the local Darkinjung people

1983

The 1983 concert ran over the Australia Day long weekend, from Friday 28th to Monday 31 January 1983. The event featured an all Australian music bill and comedian Austen Tayshus as M.C.

Australian bands and artists that appeared at the event include:

 INXS
 Men at Work
 Cold Chisel
 The Angels
 The Choirboys
 Uncanny X-Men
 The Church
 Australian Crawl
 Margret Roadknight

Between 30,000 and 45,000 people are believed to have attended this concert. A significant portion of the concertgoers were stranded at Narara railway station, believing the concert was being held in Narara. Most of these people were forced to commute to Somersby via taxis.

A highlight of the event was The Angels playing with a blood red full moon rising over the stage behind them. They performed 11 songs at the concert, which were released as an album titled "Live at Narara".

The songs on this album are:

 Coming Down
 Eat City
 Mr Damage
 Stand Up
 No Secrets
 Take A Long Line
 After The Rain
 Shoot It Up
 Shadow Boxer
 Is That You
 Marseilles

This album was released on VHS in 1988, and has also been released on DVD.

INXS put on a show-stopping performance, and a fan presented Michael Hutchence with a baby lamb.

1984

In 1984 the festival returned for a second year, and also ran over the Australia Day weekend, this time from Friday 27th to Monday 30 January. Peter Sjoquist AM was involved with the organisation of the festival. Austen Tayshus was once again the M.C., and comedians Rodney Rude and George Smillovici made guest appearances.

Due to poor weather, and a mismatched international bill of artists, the numbers were down on the previous concert. Tickets were $40 in advance or $50 at the gate, and $20 for children aged 7–12.

Some international artists that appeared at the event include:

 Simple Minds
 The Pretenders
 Talking Heads"The beat goes on", by Bernard Zuel, The Sydney Morning Herald, 28 November 2003, retrieved 16 December 2005
 Annie Lennox / Eurythmics
 Def Leppard

Def Leppard played on the Sunday night, and were not well received by a crowd frustrated from the long delays and incessant rain. Many one litre plastic bottles, used to sell beer in but were filled with muddy water, were thrown onto the stage and at the band.

Official Programme

Friday 27 January
 Party Girls
 Eurogliders
 Real Life
 Eurythmics
 Simple Minds
 Mondo Rock

Saturday 28 January
From 11 am
 QED
 Zarsoff Bros
 The Johnnys
 Kids in the Kitchen
 Hoodoo Gurus
 Machinations
Break from 5 pm
 Sandii & the Sunsetz
 Models
 INXS
 The Pretenders
 Talking Heads
 Mental As Anything

Sunday 29 January
From 11 am
 Drop Bears
 Deckchairs Overboard
 Strange Tennants
 The Expression
 Dynamic Hepnotics
 Little Heroes
Break from 5 pm
 Sunnyboys
 Jon English & The Foster Bros.
 Def Leppard
 The Radiators
 Australian Crawl
 Allniters

Monday 30 January
 Mighty Guys
 Celibate Rifles
 Avion

References

External links
Hutchence, Tina, Glassop, Patricia, "Just a Man"
Australian Crawl Albums
"How Green is my Valley", by Ben Cubby, The Sydney Morning Herald, 10 December 2004, retrieved 16 December 2005
"The beat goes on", by Bernard Zuel, The Sydney Morning Herald, 28 November 2003, retrieved 16 December 2005

Music festivals in Australia